The FMW/WEW Hardcore Championship was a hardcore wrestling championship contested in Frontier Martial-Arts Wrestling.

Title history

Combined reigns

External links
Solie's title history
FMW Closing Announcement

Frontier Martial-Arts Wrestling championships
Hardcore wrestling championships